D. Brooke Harlow is an American businesswoman, currently working as the Chief Commercial Officer of the Managed Funds Association, where she was previously Executive Vice President and Director of Public Affairs. Working as a Managing Director at Highbridge Capital Management and J.P. Morgan Chase in the past, Brooke Harlow has done communications work with companies such as Burson-Marstellar and CNN.

Education
Harlow graduated from Yale University in 1996 with a B.A. in American Studies. She was named a Rotary Scholar in 1997, and studied at El Colegio de México as part of the Masters in International Relations program in Mexico City, Mexico.

Career
Brooke Harlow is the Chief Commercial Officer at the Managed Funds Association. Her responsibilities include corporate strategy, revenue growth, investor relations and member relations at the global trade association representing the hedge fund industry. She also serves as Executive Director of the private foundation the Center For Alternative Investment Education. Harlow was the Executive Vice President and Managing Director for Marketing and Communications at the Managed Funds Association from 2009 until 2018.

Before joining MFA, Harlow was Managing Director of Communications and Public Affairs at New York-based hedge fund manager Highbridge Capital Management, where her responsibilities included corporate communications, marketing, branding and public affairs. She also served as the firm’s spokesperson.

Prior to her work with Highbridge Capital, Harlow was Vice President of Investment Bank Marketing and Communications at JP Morgan Chase for six years.

Harlow served as a senior associate in the public affairs practice at Burson-Marsteller in Washington, D.C., and worked as a field producer for CNN in Washington, D.C. and Mexico City.

Other activities
Ms. Harlow is a life member of the Council on Foreign Relations, a member of the Women's Board of the Boys Club of New York City,  and an advisor to the Center for Public Leadership at Harvard University. She is a member of the National Press Club in Washington, D.C. Harlow is a board member of the Surgeons OverSeas (SOS) Board of Directors, and a Sustaining Angel at 100 Women in Hedge Funds.  Harlow is also a supporter of the Museum of the City of New York, the Central Park Conservancy women’s committee  and the Horticultural Society of New York City. Harlow has been published on issues related to regulation and legislation around the hedge fund industry  and is a frequent speaker and moderator on topics related to and about the media and the alternative investment industry.

Personal life
Brooke married Kevin Scott Lynyak on June 16, 2007.

References

American telecommunications industry businesspeople
Living people
Yale University alumni
Year of birth missing (living people)